Pseudamyciaea is a genus of spiders in the family Thomisidae. It was first described in 1905 by Simon. , it contains only one species, Pseudamyciaea fuscicauda, found in Java.

References

Thomisidae
Monotypic Araneomorphae genera
Spiders of Asia